Enrico dal Covolo SDB (born 5 October 1950) is a Catholic bishop and Italian theologian, Assessor of the Pontifical Committee for Historical Sciences from 15 January 2019. He previously served as the rector of the Pontifical Lateran University from his appointment on 30 June 2010 until 2 June 2018. In addition he was also the postulator of the cause of canonization of Pope John Paul I from 2003 until 2016.

Biography 
Enrico dal Covolo was born in Feltre, Italy. He made his novitate at Albarè and took his first vows on 2 October 1973. He was ordained at age 29, in Milan, on 22 December 1979 as a Salesian of Don Bosco.

In 1986, dal Covolo was transferred to the Vice Province of the Salesian Pontifical University in Rome and in the following years. Dal Covolo held a number of academic appointments: professor of ancient Christian literature and a specialist in the Fathers of the Church, dean of the faculty of Literature between 1993 and 2000, and between 2000 and 2003 Vice-Rector of the University.

Dal Covolo is a member of the Pontifical Committee for Historical Sciences, a consultor of the Congregation for the Doctrine of the Faith, a member of the Commission dealing with dispensations from priestly obligations, and a consultor of the Congregation for the Clergy.

In 2003, dal Covolo was appointed by the Rector Major of the Salesians, Pascual Chávez, to serve as Postulator General for the Causes of Saints of the Salesian Family. Dal Covolo is the second Salesian on the Commission for Sacred Archaeology- Antonio Baruffa was confirmed for a further five-year period.

From 21 to 27 February 2010, he preached the Lenten spiritual exercises to Pope Benedict XVI and to the Roman Curia at the Redemptoris Mater chapel. He selected the priestly vocation as the theme of the meditations.

He was appointed as rector of the Pontifical Lateran University, on 30 June 2010, replacing Archbishop Salvatore Fisichella, who had also been serving until then as an auxiliary bishop of Rome and as President of the Pontifical Academy for Life. Fisichella had been appointed the first president of the Pontifical Council for the Promotion of the New Evangelisation.

In recognition of his new responsibilities as the Pontifical Lateran University's rector, dal Covolo was appointed Titular Bishop of Heraclea on 15 September 2010. Tarcisio Bertone, Cardinal Secretary of State, was the principal consecrator at the Episcopal ordination.

On Tuesday, 18 September 2012, dal Covolo was appointed by Pope Benedict XVI to serve as one of the papally-appointed Synodal Fathers (as a non-diocesan ordinary, but still an episcopal member, he will represent the University) for the upcoming October 2012 13th Ordinary General Assembly of the Synod of Bishops on the New Evangelization.

On 15 January 2019 Pope Francis appointed him Assessor of the Pontifical Committee for Historical Sciences, a new role inside the committee.

Publications 

 I Severi e il Cristianesimo
 Chiesa Società Politica. Aree di "laicità" nel cristianesimo delle origini
 I Padri della Chiesa maestri di formazione sacerdotale
 Introduzione ai Padri della Chiesa, voll. 6, 1990-1999
 Lo studio dei Padri della Chiesa oggi, 1991
 La missione del Redentore. Studi sull'Enciclica missionaria di Giovanni Paolo II, 1992
 Per una cultura dell'Europa unita. Lo studio dei Padri della Chiesa oggi, 1992
 Sacerdoti per la nuova evangelizzazione. Studi sull'Esortazione apostolica Pastores dabo vobis di Giovanni Paolo II, 1994
 Chiesa Società Politica. Aree di "laicità" nel cristianesimo delle origini, 1994
 Storia della teologia, 1. Dalle origini a Bernardo di Chiaravalle, (cur.) 1995
 Laici e laicità nei primi secoli della Chiesa, Letture cristiane del primo millennio 21, 1995
 Donna e matrimonio alle origini della Chiesa, 1996
 Cultura e promozione umana. Fondamenti e itinerari, 1996
 La catechesi al traguardo. Studi sul Catechismo della Chiesa Cattolica, 1997
 Eusebio di Vercelli e il suo tempo, 1997
 Sacerdoti come i nostri Padri. I Padri della Chiesa maestri di formazione sacerdotale, 1998
 Cultura e promozione umana. La cura del corpo e dello spirito nell'antichità classica e nei primi secoli cristiani: un magistero ancora attuale?, (cur.) 1998
 Gli Imperatori Severi. Storia Archeologia Religione, (cur.) 1999
 Mosè ci viene letto nella Chiesa. Lettura delle Omelie di Origene sulla Genesi, (cur.) 1999
 La grazia del giubileo. Fra storia teologia e vita, 2000
 Cultura e promozione umana. La cura del corpo e dello spirito dai primi secoli cristiani al Medioevo: contributi e attualizzazioni ulteriori, (cur.) 2001
 Omelie su Geremia. Lettura origeniana, (cur.) 2001
 Chiesa e impero. Da Augusto a Giustiniano, (cur.) 2001
 "Paideia" e "Humanitas". Per la pace nel terzo millennio, in "Rivista di Scienze dell'Educazione", (cur.) 2001
 Omelie sull'Esodo. Lettura origeniana, (cur.) 2002
 Il latino e i cristiani. Un bilancio all'inizio del terzo millennio, (cur.) 2002
 In ascolto della parola, 2002
 Omelie sul Levitico. Lettura origeniana, (cur.) 2003
 Omelie sui numeri. Lettura origeniana, 2004
 Il contributo delle scienze storiche allo studio del Nuovo Testamento. Atti del Convegno, (cur.) 2005
 L'opera di Luca. L'oggi di Dio e l'oggi dell'uomo, 2006
 Attratti dall'amore. Riflessioni sull'Enciclica Deus caritas est di Benedetto XVI, 2006
 Commento a Giovanni. Lettura origeniana, 2006
 Omelie su Giosuè. Lettura origeniana, 2007
 Lampada ai miei passi. Leggere la Parola come i nostri Padri, 2007
 Cristo e Asclepio. Culti terapeutici e taumaturgici nel mondo mediterraneo antico fra cristiani e pagani, (cur.) 2008
 Il "Vangelo secondo Paolo". Qualche esempio di lectio divina per l'anno paolino, 2008
 Storia della mariologia, 1. Dal modello biblico al modello letterario, (cur.) 2009
 Santi nella famiglia salesiana, 2009
 Le parabole del regno nel commento a Matteo. Lettura origeniana, 2009
 L'opera di Luca. L'"oggi" di Dio e l'"oggi" dell'uomo si incontrano nella fede, nella speranza e nella carità operosa dei credenti, 2009
 In ascolto dell'altro. Esercizi spirituali con Benedetto XVI, Libreria Editrice Vaticana, 2010
 Il Vangelo e i Padri. Per un'esegesi teologica, Rogate, 2010
 Omelie sul Vangelo di Luca. Lettura origeniana, (cur.) 2010
 Cristo nostra salvezza. Il mistero pasquale nella Bibbia e nei Padri, con Raniero Cantalamessa, Lateran University Press, 2011
 Il grido di Giobbe, 2011
 "Chi è Gesù Cristo?". La questione di Dio nel Vangelo di Marco, 2011
 "L'educazione è cosa di cuore". La responsabilità degli educatori oggi, Lateran University Press, 2012
 Il Padre lo vide da lontano... L'opera di Luca: l'"oggi" dell'uomo e l'"oggi" di Dio si incontrano nella fede della Chiesa, 2012
 Comunicare la fede. Per una nuova evangelizzazione, Lateran University Press, 2012
 Forme di vita spirituale nei Padri della Chiesa, Lateran University Press, 2012
 "Si alzò e lo seguì" (Mt. 9,9). Camminare, costruire, edificare con la cultura nelle periferie esistenziali della città. Il Vangelo secondo Matteo, 2013
 Ascolta, scende la sera, Lateran University Press, 2014
 "Voi stessi date a loro da mangiare...", Lateran University Press, 2014
 L'università al traguardo, Lateran University Press, 2015
 Filosofia e teologia tra il IV e V secolo. Contesto, figure e momenti di una sintesi epocale, Lateran University Press, 2016
 Dante, Celestino, Bonifacio. L'indulgenza del Giubileo è ancora di moda?, LBE - La Bonifaciana Edizioni, 2019 
 Cristo o Asclepio? I primi cristiani e la medicina, LBE - La Bonifaciana Edizioni, 2020

References

External links

Living people
Italian Roman Catholic titular bishops
Salesians of Don Bosco
Patristic Institute Augustinianum alumni
1950 births